Sopot is a village in Krapina-Zagorje County, Croatia. 

Populated places in Krapina-Zagorje County